King and Queen Hill is a summit in Silver Bow County, Montana, in the United States.

References

Mountains of Silver Bow County, Montana
Mountains of Montana